Frederik Helstrup Jensen (born 16 March 1993) is a Danish professional footballer who plays for FC Helsingør in the Danish 1st Division.

Club career 
Helstrup started his career as youth prospect of the amateur clubs Gladsaxe-Hero BK, Virum-Sorgenfri BK and later professional club Lyngby Boldklub. In the summer of 2011, Lyngby's coaching staff promoted him to the first team squad. On 14 August 2011, he made his Superliga debut in a 1–1 draw against AC Horsens. In the 2011–12 season, Lyngby relegated to the Danish 1st Division, where he played for another year. In September 2013, he signed a three-year contract with AC Horsens, for whom he made 35 appearances at the 1st Division.

In March 2015, Helstrup was loaned for four months to Swedish club Helsingborgs IF, coached by Henrik Larsson. On 4 April 2015, he made his Allsvenskan debut in a goalless match against Kalmar FF. Before the end of the loan period, the club decided to sign Helstrup on a permanent transfer. For two consecutive seasons he was a starter in the defense. After the 2016 season ended, Helsingborgs IF suffered relegation to Superettan, after losing 2–3 to Halmstads BK. Helstrup played in both matches, scoring an own goal in the first one.

In the summer of 2017, he moved to Polish Ekstraklasa club Arka Gdynia led by head coach Leszek Ojrzyński. In the seventh matchday of the 2017–18 season, he made his debut in a 3–0 defeat to Lech Poznań. In the same season, Helstrup reached the finals of the Polish Cup with Arka Gdynia. In 2018, he won the Polish SuperCup with Arka after a 3–2 victory over Legia Warsaw.

In 2020, Helstrup moved to Dutch Eerste Divisie club Almere City FC as a free agent, where he signed a two-year contract. After eight years abroad, Helstrup returned to his homeland on 13 July 2022, when he signed a two-year deal with Danish 1st Division side FC Helsingør.

Honours
Arka Gdynia
Polish SuperCup: 2018

References

External links
 Frederik Helstrup DBU profile
 
 

1993 births
Living people
Footballers from Copenhagen
Association football defenders
Danish men's footballers
Denmark youth international footballers
Danish expatriate men's footballers
Danish Superliga players
Danish 1st Division players
Lyngby Boldklub players
AC Horsens players
Ekstraklasa players
Arka Gdynia players
Allsvenskan players
Helsingborgs IF players
Eerste Divisie players
Almere City FC players
FC Helsingør players
Expatriate footballers in Poland
Expatriate footballers in Sweden
Expatriate footballers in the Netherlands
Danish expatriate sportspeople in Poland
Danish expatriate sportspeople in Sweden
Danish expatriate sportspeople in the Netherlands